Andrew John Clarke (born 9 November 1975) is an English cricketer. Clarke is a left-handed batsman who bowls right-arm medium pace. He was born at Brentwood, Essex.

Clarke made his debut in List A cricket for the Essex Cricket Board against Suffolk in the 2001 Cheltenham & Gloucester Trophy. It was in that format of the game that his debut for Essex came against Middlesex in 2001. From 2001 to 2004, he represented Essex in 40 List A matches, the last of which came against Warwickshire in the 2004 totesport League. In his 40 List A matches for Essex, he took 53 wickets at a bowling average of 24.05, with best figures of 4/28.

Clarke made his first-class debut for Essex against Glamorgan in the 2002 County Championship. From 2002 to 2004, he represented the county in 10 first-class matches, the last of which came against Derbyshire. In his 10 first-class matches, he scored 179 runs at a batting average of 14.91, with a high score of 41. In the field he took 4 catches. With the ball he took 26 wickets at an average of 29.30, with a single five wicket haul which gave him best figures of 5/54.

Clarke made his Twenty20 debut for Essex in the 2004 Twenty20 Cup against Hampshire. During the 2004 competition he played 4 matches, the last of which came against Sussex. In his 4 matches he took 2 wickets at an average of 46.00, with best figures of 1/18.

In 2007, he joined Cambridgeshire. His debut in the Minor Counties Championship came against Suffolk. From 2007 to 2008, he represented the county in 4 Championship matches, the last of which came against Hertfordshire. Clarke's debut in the MCCA Knockout Trophy for Cambridgeshire came against Wiltshire in 2007. From 2007 to 2009, he played 10 Trophy matches for the county, the last of which came against Lincolnshire.

References

External links
Andrew Clarke at Cricinfo
Andrew Clarke at CricketArchive

1975 births
Living people
People from Brentwood, Essex
Sportspeople from Essex
English cricketers
Essex Cricket Board cricketers
Essex cricketers
Cambridgeshire cricketers